Guillaume IV may refer to:

 William IV, Duke of Aquitaine (937–994)
 William IV, Count of Nevers (c. 1130–1168)
 William IV, Grand Duke of Luxembourg (1852–1912)

See also
William IV (disambiguation)